Footballer of the Year in Russia was an annual award given by Futbol weekly to the Russian Premier League player of the season. The title was awarded according to the results of a poll conducted by the newspaper. Players of each Premier League club are polled. The award started in 1964 as Soviet Footballer of the Year until changing its name for the 1992 season. The last title awarded in 2021. Brazilian Daniel Carvalho became the first foreign player to win the award in 2005.

List of winners

See also 
 Soviet Footballer of the Year
 Footballer of the Year in Russia (Sport-Express), Sport-Express daily newspaper version

References

External links 
 Futbol weekly official blog 

Russia 2
Awards established in 1992
1992 establishments in Russia
Russian football trophies and awards
Annual events in Russia
Association football player non-biographical articles